Pangalloanserae is a clade of birds defined in a 2001 study by Jacques Gauthier and Kevin de Queiroz as "most inclusive clade containing Galloanserae but not Neoaves". It contains crown Galloanserae as well as all stem-galloanserans.

References 

Neognathae
Extant Maastrichtian first appearances